Stasys Šalkauskis (May 16, 1886 in Ariogala, Lithuania – December 4, 1941 in Šiauliai, Soviet Union) was a Lithuanian philosopher, educator, rector of Vytautas Magnus University.  His philosophy of culture was developed by Antanas Maceina and other philosophers.

References 

1886 births
1941 deaths
Salkauskis
Social philosophers
20th-century Lithuanian philosophers
Rectors of Vytautas Magnus University